Blast-A-Way is an iOS puzzle video game developed by Swedish studio Illusion Labs and released on August 30, 2012.

Reception
The game has a Metacritic score of 87%, based on 10 critic reviews.

Slide To Play wrote " If you've been looking for a game that will impress your friends, look no further. Blast-A-Way is a fun, casual game that looks fantastic. " AppSpy said " Blast-A-Way invokes the friendly atmosphere of Little Big Planet, but puts you behind the wheel of three explosive maniacs set on solving their problems with brute force - all for the children you have to understand. " Multiplayer.it wrote " Blast-A-Way it's a true surprise, even on the quite crowded physics puzzle genre. Another quality game from Illusions Labs. " TouchGen said " Overall, Blast A Way is great puzzle game. It's beautifully presented, but more importably its fresh and challenging, with that all important 'one more try' factor. " Digital Spy said " Camera adjustment issues aside, inspired level design and creative puzzle mechanics make Blast-a-way an easy iOS recommendation. " Touch Arcade said " While Illusion Labs doesn't particularly offer anything innovative, Blast-a-Way proves that there is still room in the overcrowded puzzle arena for games that excel in pure execution. " Pocket Gamer UK wrote " A bright and slick puzzler with some excellent mechanics, and imaginative level design. "

References

2012 video games
IOS games
IOS-only games
Puzzle video games
Video games developed in Sweden